Bobô may refer to different Brazilian footballers:

 Deivson Rogério da Silva (born 1985)
 Raimundo Nonato Tavares da Silva (born 1962)
 José Claudeon dos Santos (born 1982)

See also 
 Bobo (disambiguation)